The 1979 Israel Super Cup was the ninth Israel Super Cup (14th, including unofficial matches, as the competition wasn't played within the Israel Football Association in its first 5 editions, until 1969), an annual Israel football match played between the winners of the previous season's Top Division and Israel State Cup. 

The match was played between Maccabi Tel Aviv, champions of the 1978–79 Liga Leumit and Beitar Jerusalem, winners of the 1978–79 Israel State Cup.

This was Maccabi Tel Aviv's 5th Israel Super Cup appearance (including unofficial matches) and Beitar's third. At the match, played at Bloomfield Stadium, Maccabi Tel Aviv won 2–0.

Match details

References

1979
Super Cup
Super Cup 1979
Super Cup 1979
Israel Super Cup matches